Yoan Granvorka (born 9 June 1997) is a Swiss-French professional basketball player for ESSM Le Portel of the French LNB Pro A.

Standing at 2.01 m (6 ft 7 in), he usually plays as forward.

Professional career
Granvorka started his career playing in the youth ranks of SLUC Nancy Basket. On 15 August 2018, Granvorka signed with BBC Monthey. In April 2018, Granvorka declared for the 2018 NBA draft.

On June 22, 2022, he has signed with ESSM Le Portel of the French LNB Pro A.

International career
Granvorka has represented the French national basketball team under-20.

References

1997 births
Living people
BBC Monthey players
ESSM Le Portel players
Forwards (basketball)
French men's basketball players
Union Neuchâtel Basket players
People from Morges
Sportspeople from the canton of Vaud
Swiss men's basketball players